The 2018–19 Loyola Marymount Lions men's basketball team represents Loyola Marymount University during the 2018–19 NCAA Division I men's basketball season. The Lions are led by fifth-year head coach Mike Dunlap. They play their home games at Gersten Pavilion in Los Angeles, California as members of the West Coast Conference. They finished the season 22-12, 8-8 in WCC Play to tie for 5th place. They lost in the second round of the WCC tournament  to Pepperdine. They received an at-large bid to the College Basketball Invitational where they defeated California Baptist and Brown to advance to the semifinals where they lost to South Florida.

Previous season
The Lions finished the 2017–18 season finished the season 11–20, 5–13 in WCC play to finish in eighth place. They defeated Portland in the first round of the WCC tournament before losing in the quarterfinals to Gonzaga.

Offseason

Departures

Incoming transfers

2018 recruiting class

Roster

Schedule and results

|-
!colspan=12 style=| Non-conference regular season

|-
!colspan=12 style=|WCC regular season

|-
!colspan=12 style=|WCC tournament

|-
!colspan=12 style=|College Basketball Invitational

Source

References

Loyola Marymount Lions men's basketball seasons
Loyola Marymount
Loyola Marymount basketball, men
Loyola Marymount basketball, men
Loyola Marymount basketball, men
Loyola Marymount basketball, men
Loyola